Masaichi Kobayashi (14 February 1891 – 25 December 1973) was a Japanese architect. His work was part of the architecture event in the art competition at the 1932 Summer Olympics.

References

1891 births
1973 deaths
20th-century Japanese architects
Olympic competitors in art competitions
People from Ibaraki Prefecture